Lee Jung-Rae  (born 21 November 1979) is a South Korean football goalkeeper, who plays for Chungju Hummel in K League Challenge. His previous clubs were Chunnam Dragons, Gyeongnam FC, Gwangju Sangmu and Gwangju FC.

External links 
 

1979 births
Living people
Association football goalkeepers
South Korean footballers
Jeonnam Dragons players
Gyeongnam FC players
Gimcheon Sangmu FC players
Gwangju FC players
Chungju Hummel FC players
K League 1 players
K League 2 players